Saylesville may refer to the following places in the U.S. state of Wisconsin:
Saylesville, Dodge County, Wisconsin, an unincorporated community
Saylesville, Waukesha County, Wisconsin, an unincorporated community